Iranian Azerbaijanis, also known as Iranian Azeris, Iranian Turks, Persian Turks, or Persian Azerbaijanis, are Iranians of Azerbaijani ethnicity who may speak the Azerbaijani language as their first language.
Iranian Azerbaijanis are a Turkic-speaking people of Iranian origin.

Iranian Azerbaijanis are mainly found in and are native to the Iranian Azerbaijan region including provinces of (East Azerbaijan, Ardabil, Zanjan, West Azerbaijan) and in smaller numbers, in other provinces such as Kurdistan, Qazvin, Hamadan, Gilan, Markazi and Kermanshah. Iranian Azerbaijanis also constitute a significant minority in Tehran, Karaj and other regions.

Demographics

Azerbaijanis comprise the largest minority ethnic group in Iran. Apart from Iranian Azerbaijan (provinces of West Azerbaijan, East Azerbaijan, Ardabil and Zanjan), Azerbaijani populations are found in large numbers in four other provinces: Hamadan (includes other Turkic ethnic groups such as Afshar, Gharehgozloo, Shahsevan, and Baharloo), Qazvin, Markazi, and Kurdistan. Azerbaijani-populated of Markazi province includes some parts and villages of Komijan, Khondab, Saveh, Zarandieh, Shazand, and Farahan. In Kurdistan, Azerbaijanis are mainly found in villages around Qorveh.

Azerbaijanis have also immigrated and resettled in large numbers in Central Iran, mainly Tehran,  Qom and Karaj. They have also emigrated and resettled in large numbers in Khorasan. Immigrant Azerbaijani communities have been represented by people prominent not only among urban and industrial working classes but also in commercial, administrative, political, religious, and intellectual circles.

According to the Iranologist Victoria Arakelova, estimating the number of Azeris in Iran has been hampered since the dissolution of the Soviet Union through the indoctrination of the idea of a separated nation (Azeris in Iran and Azerbaijan) with various figures featuring in politically-biased publications as the "Azerbaijani minority of Iran" without any justification or reliable sources, even though all Iranian censuses distinguish exclusively religious minorities. She further claims that in the early 1990s, when the entire population of Iran was barely 60 million, the most popular figure on the population of Azerbaijanis in Iran was around 30 million, half of the country's population, widely circulating not only among academics and political analysts but also in the official circles of Russia and the West. During the 2000s, the figure decreased to 20 million, which has been popularly used and kept up-to-date, only with a few minor adjustments. Arakelova puts the number of Azerbaijanis in Iran at 6 to 6.5 million.

Ethnic groups

Sub-ethnic groups of the Azerbaijanis within the modern-day borders of Iran following the ceding of the Caucasus to Russia in the 19th century, include the Shahsevan, the Qarapapaqs, the Ayrums, the Bayat, the Qajars, the Qaradaghis, and the Gharagozloo.

Background

Origins

A comparative study (2013) on the complete mitochondrial DNA diversity in Iranians has indicated that Iranian Azerbaijanis are more related to the people of Georgia, than they are to other Iranians, as well as to Armenians. The same multidimensional scaling plot demonstrates the intermediate position of Caucasian Azerbaijanis between the Azeris/Georgians and Turks/Iranians groupings. There is no significant difference between Iranian Azerbaijanis and other major ethnic groups of Iran.

According to the scholar of historical geography, Xavier de Planhol: "Azerbaijani material culture, a result of this multi-secular symbiosis, is thus a subtle combination of indigenous elements and nomadic contributions…. It is a Turkish language learned and spoken by Iranian peasants". According to Richard Frye: "The Turkish speakers of Azerbaijan (q.v.) are mainly descended from the earlier Iranian speakers, several pockets of whom still exist in the region. A massive migration of Oghuz Turks in the 11th and 12th centuries gradually Turkified Azerbaijan as well as Anatolia." According to Olivier Roy: "The mass of the Oghuz Turkic tribes who crossed the Amu Darya towards the west left the Iranian plateau, which remained Persian, and established themselves more to the west, in Anatolia. Here they divided into Ottomans, who were Sunni and settled, and Turkmens, who were nomads and in part Shiite (or, rather, Alevi). The latter was to keep the name "Turkmen" for a long time: from the thirteenth century onwards they "Turkised" the Iranian populations of Azerbaijan (who spoke west Iranian languages such as Caucasian Tat, which is still found in residual forms), thus creating a new identity based on Shiism and the use of Oghuz Turkic. These are the people today known as Azerbaijanis.". According to Rybakov: "Speaking of the Azerbaijan culture originating at that time, in the XIV-XV cc., one must bear in mind, first of all, literature and other parts of culture organically connected with the language. As for the material culture, it remained traditional even after the Turkicization of the local population. However, the presence of a massive layer of Iranians that took part in the formation of the Azerbaijani ethnos, have imposed its imprint, primarily on the lexicon of the Azerbaijani language which contains a great number of Iranian and Arabic words. The latter entered both the Azerbaijani and Turkish languages mainly through the Iranian intermediary. Having become independent, the Azerbaijani culture retained close connections with the Iranian and Arab cultures. They were reinforced by a common religion and common cultural-historical traditions.".

It is believed that the Medes mixed with an indigenous population, the Mannai, a group related to the Urartians. Ancient written accounts, such as one written by Arab historian Abu al-Hasan Ali ibn al-Husayn al-Masudi (896–956), attest to the presence of Persians in the historical regions of Azerbaijan and Arran and mention the Old Azeri language that was similar to Persian. But Al-Muqaddasi also wrote of the presence of the Persian language in the region. This is supported by the many figures of Persian literature, such as Qatran Tabrizi, Shams Tabrizi, Nezami, and Khaghani, who wrote in Persian prior to and during the Oghuz migration, as well as by Strabo, and Al-Istakhri, who all describe the language of the region as Persian.

Scholars note cultural similarities between modern Persians and Azerbaijanis. Archaeological evidence indicates that the Iranian religion of Zoroastrianism was prominent throughout the Caucasus before Christianity and Islam and that the influence of various Persian Empires added to the Iranian character of the area. Other common Perso-Azerbaijani features include Iranian place names such as Tabriz and the name Azerbaijan itself.

History

Background: Dividing of the Azerbaijanis by the Russian Empire

Following the Russo-Persian Wars of 1804–13 and 1826–28, the territories of the Iranian Qajar dynasty in the Caucasus were forcefully ceded to the Russian Empire and the Treaty of Gulistan in 1813 and the Treaty of Turkmenchay in 1828 finalized the borders between the Russian Empire and Qajar Iran. The areas to the north of the river Aras, including the territory of the contemporary Republic of Azerbaijan, were Iranian territory until they were occupied by Russia over the course of the 19th century. The Russo-Persian Wars of the 19th century settled the modern-day boundary of Iran, stripping it of all its Caucasian territories and incorporating them into the Russian Empire. The eventual formation of the Azerbaijan Democratic Republic in 1918 established the territory of modern Azerbaijan.

As a direct result of Qajar Iran's forced ceding to Russia, the Azerbaijanis are nowadays parted between two nations: Iran and Azerbaijan. Despite living on two sides of an international border, the Azerbaijanis form a single ethnic group.

Russo-Persian War (1826–28)
The burden of the Russo-Persian War (1826–28) was on the tribes of Qaradağ region, who being in front line, provided human resources and provision of the Iranian army. In the wake of the war, a significant fraction of the inhabitants of this area lived as nomadic tribes (ایلات). The major tribes included; Cilibyanlu 1,500 tents and houses, Karacurlu 2500, Haji Alilu 800, Begdillu 200, and various minor groups 500. At the time Ahar, with 3,500 inhabitants, was the only city of Qaradağ. The Haji-Alilu tribe played major rule in the later political developments.

Persian Constitutional Revolution of early twentieth century

During the Persian Constitutional Revolution , Tabriz was at the center of battles which followed the ascent to the throne of Mohammad Ali Shah Qajar on 8 January 1907. The revolutionary forces were headed by Sattar Khan who was originally from Arasbaran. Haydar Khan Amo-oghli had significant contribution in the inception and progression of the revolution, and introducing leftist ideas into Iranian mainstream politics. During the following tumultuous years, Amir Arshad, the headman of Haji-Alilu tribe, had a major impact on the subsequent political developments in Iran in relation to the status of Iranian Kurds. He is credited with fending off communism from Iran.

Role of Iranian Azerbaijani intellectuals in modern Iranian ultra-nationalism

The ill-fated Constitutional Revolution did not bring democracy to Iran. Instead, Rezā Shāh, then Brigadier-General of the Persian Cossack Brigade, deposed Ahmad Shah Qajar, the last Shah of the Qajar dynasty, and founded the Pahlavi dynasty in 1925 and established a despotic monarchy. His insistence on ethnic nationalism and cultural unitarism along with forced detribalization and sedentarization resulted in suppression of several ethnic and social groups, including Azerbaijanis. Ironically, the main architect of this totalitarian policy, which was justified by reference to racial ultra-nationalism, was Mirza Fatali Akhundov, an intellectual from Azerbaijan. In accordance with the Orientalist views of the supremacy of the Aryan peoples, he idealized pre-Islamic Achaemenid and Sassanid empires, whilst negating the 'Islamization' of Persia by Muslim forces." This idealization of a distant past was put into practice by both the Pahlavi kings, particularly Mohammad Reza Pahlavi who honored himself with the title Āryāmehr, Light of the Aryans. Mohammad Reza Pahlavi in an interview concisely expressed his views by declaring, "we Iranians are Aryans, and the fact that we are not adjacent to other Aryan nations in Europe is just a geographical anomaly.".

Mirza Fatali Akhundov is not the only Azerbaijani intellectual in framing Iranian ultra-nationalism. Hassan Taqizadeh, the organizer of "Iran Society" in Berlin, has contributed to the development of Iranian nationalism. Since 1916 he published "Kaveh" periodical in Farsi language, which included articles emphasizing the racial unity of Germans and Iranians. Ahmad Kasravi, Taqi Arani, Hossein Kazemzadeh (Iranshahr) and Mahmoud Afshar advocated the suppression of the Azerbaijani language as they supposed that the multilingualism contradicted the racial purity of Iranians. Therefore, It is noteworthy that, contrary to what one might expect, many of the leading agents of the construction of an Iranian bounded territorial entity came from non-Persian-speaking ethnic minorities, and the foremost were the Azerbaijanis, rather than the nation's titular ethnic group, the Persians.

Pan-Turkism

The most important political development affecting the Middle East at the beginning of the twentieth century was the collapse of the Ottoman and the Russian empires. The idea of a greater homeland for all Turks was propagated by pan-Turkism, which was adopted almost at once as a main ideological pillar by the Committee of Union and Progress and somewhat later by other political caucuses in what remained of the Ottoman Empire. On the eve of World War I, pan-Turkist propaganda focused chiefly on the Turkic-speaking peoples of the southern Caucasus, in Iranian Azerbaijan and Turkistan in Central Asia, with the ultimate purpose of persuading them all to secede from the larger political entities to which they belonged and to join the new pan-Turkic homeland.

It was this latter appeal to Iranian Azerbaijanis which, contrary to pan-Turkist intentions, caused a small group of Azerbaijani intellectuals to become the most vociferous advocates of Iran's territorial integrity and sovereignty. If in Europe "romantic nationalism responded to the damage likely to be caused by modernism by providing a new and larger sense of belonging, an all-encompassing totality, which brought about new social ties, identity and meaning, and a new sense of history from one's origin on to an illustrious future,"(42) in Iran after the Constitutional movement romantic nationalism was adopted by the Azerbaijani Democrats as a reaction to the irredentist policies threatening the country's territorial integrity. In their view, assuring territorial integrity was a necessary first step on the road to establishing the rule of law in society and a competent modern state which would safeguard collective as well as individual rights. It was within this context that their political loyalty outweighed their other ethnic or regional affinities.

The failure of the Democrats in the arena of Iranian politics after the Constitutional movement and the start of modern state-building paved the way for the emergence of the titular ethnic group's cultural nationalism. Whereas the adoption of integrationist policies preserved Iran's geographic integrity and provided the majority of Iranians with a secure and firm national identity, the blatant ignoring of other demands of the Constitutional movement, such as the call for the formation of a society based on law and order, left the country still searching for a political identity. The ultimate purpose was to persuade these populations to secede from the larger political entities to which they belonged and join the new pan-Turkic homeland. It was the latter appeal to Iranian Azerbaijanis, which, contrary to Pan-Turkist intentions, caused a small group of Azerbaijani intellectuals to become the strongest advocates of the territorial integrity of Iran.

After the constitutional revolution in Iran, a romantic nationalism was adopted by Azerbaijani Democrats as a reaction to the pan-Turkist irredentist policies threatening Iran's territorial integrity. It was during this period that Iranism and linguistic homogenization policies were proposed as a defensive nature against all others. Contrary to what one might expect, foremost among innovating this defensive nationalism were Iranian Azerbaijanis. They viewed that assuring the territorial integrity of the country was the first step in building a society based on law and a modern state. Through this framework, their political loyalty outweighed their ethnic and regional affiliations. The adoption of these integrationist policies paved the way for the emergence of the titular ethnic group's cultural nationalism.

World War II and Soviet intervention

In late 1941 Soviet forces invaded Iran in coordination with British Army under an operation known as Anglo-Soviet invasion of Iran. Their forces broke through the border and moved from the Azerbaijan SSR into Iranian Azerbaijan. Reza Shah was forced by the invading British to abdicate in favor of his son Mohammad Reza Pahlavi who replaced his father as Shah on the throne on 16 September 1941. At the aftermath of a four-year-long tumultuous period the Azerbaijan People's Government, a Soviet puppet state, was established in Tabriz, perhaps through direct involvement of the Soviet leadership. This government autonomously ruled the province from November 1945 to November 1946. However, the Soviet soon realized their idea was premature, the mass of the population did not support separatism; under largely Western pressure, the Soviet troops withdrew in 1946, which resulted in the quick collapse of the Azerbaijan People's Government.

Iranian Azerbaijani migration to Azerbaijan
Beginning in the 1850s, many Iranian Azerbaijanis opted to become work migrants and seek job opportunities in the Russian Empire, primarily in the economically booming Azerbaijani-populated part of the Caucasus. Due to them being Persian subjects, Russian offices often recorded them as "Persians". The migrants referred to one another as hamshahri ("compatriot") as an in-group identity. The word was adopted by the Azerbaijani-speaking locals as həmşəri and has since been applied by them to Iranian Azerbaijani migrants in general. Already in the nineteenth century, the word also spread to urban varieties of Russian of Baku and Tiflis in the form of gamshara (гамшара) or amshara (амшара), where it was, however, used with a negative connotation to mean "a raggamuffin". In the Soviet times, the word was borrowed into the Russian slang of Ashkhabad and was used to refer to forestallers.

Iranian Azerbaijanis often worked menial jobs, including on dyer's madder plantations in Guba where 9,000 out of 14,000 Iranian Azerbaijani contract workers were employed as of 1867. In the 1886 economic report on the life of the peasantry of the Guba district, Yagodynsky reported frequent cases of intermarriage between the Iranian work migrants and local women which prompted the former to settle in villages near Guba and quickly assimilate. Children from such families would be completely integrated in the community and not be regarded as foreigners or outsiders by its residents.

Starting from the late nineteenth century, Baku was another popular destination for Iranian Azerbaijanis, thanks to its highly developing oil industry. By the beginning of the twentieth century, they already constituted 50% of all the oil workers of Baku, and numbered 9,426 people in 1897, 11,132 people in 1903 and 25,096 people in 1913. Amo-oghli and Sattar Khan notably worked in the Baku oil fields before returning to Iran and engaging in politics.

In 1925, there were 45,028 Iranian-born Azerbaijanis in the Azerbaijan SSR. Of those, 15,000 (mostly oil workers, port and navy workers and railway workers) had retained Iranian citizenship by 1938 and were concentrated in Baku and Ganja. In accordance with the 1938 decision of the Central Committee of the Communist Party of the Soviet Union, residents of Azerbaijan with Iranian citizenship were given 10 days to apply for Soviet citizenship and were then relocated to Kazakhstan. Those who refused (numbering 2,878 people) became subject to deportation back to Iran immediately. Some naturalized Iranian Azerbaijanis were later accused of various anti-Soviet activities and arrested or even executed in the so-called "Iranian operation" of 1938.

After the fall of the Azerbaijan People's Government in 1946, as many as 10,000 Iranian Azerbaijani political émigrés relocated to Soviet Azerbaijan, fleeing the inevitable repressions of the Shah's government. Notable Azerbaijanis of Iranian descent living in Azerbaijan included writers Mirza Ibrahimov and Mir Jalal Pashayev, singers Rubaba Muradova and Fatma Mukhtarova, actress Munavvar Kalantarli, poets Madina Gulgun and Balash Azeroghlu and others.

Islamic republic era and today

However, with the advent of the Iranian Revolution in 1979, the emphasis shifted away from nationalism as the new government highlighted religion as the main unifying factor. Within the Islamic Revolutionary government there emerged an Azerbaijani nationalist faction led by Ayatollah Kazem Shariatmadari, who advocated greater regional autonomy and wanted the constitution to be revised to include secularists and opposition parties; this was denied. Other Azerbaijanis played an important rule in the revolution including Mir-Hossein Mousavi, Mehdi Bazargan, Sadeq Khalkhali, and Ali Khamenei.

Azerbaijanis make up 25% of Tehran's population and 30.3% – 33% of the population of the Tehran Province. Azerbaijanis in Tehran live in all of the cities within Tehran Province. They are by far the largest ethnic group after Persians in Tehran and the wider Tehran Province.

In October 2020, several protests erupted in Iranian cities, including the capital Tehran and Tabriz, in support of Azerbaijan in its conflict with Armenia over the Nagorno-Karabakh region. Iranian Azerbaijani demonstrators chanted pro-Azerbaijan slogans and clashed with Iran's security forces.

Politics and society

Generally, Iranian Azerbaijanis were regarded as "a well integrated linguistic minority" by academics prior to Iran's Islamic Revolution. Despite friction, they came to be well represented at all levels of, "political, military, and intellectual hierarchies, as well as the religious hierarchy.". In addition, the current Supreme Leader of Iran, Ali Khamenei, is half Azerbaijani. In contrast to the claims of de facto discrimination of some Iranian Azerbaijanis, the government claims that its policy in the past 30 years has been one of pan-Islamism, which is based on a common Islamic religion of which diverse ethnic groups may be part, and which does not favor or repress any particular ethnicity, including the Persian majority. Persian language is thus merely used as the lingua franca of the country, which helps maintain Iran's traditional centralized model of government. More recently, the Azerbaijani language and culture is being taught and studied at the university level in Iran, and there appears to exist publications of books, newspapers and apparently, regional radio broadcasts too in the language.
Furthermore, Article 15 of Iran's constitution reads:

According to Professor. Nikki R. Keddie of UCLA: "One can purchase newspapers, books, music tapes, and videos in Azerbaijani and Kurdish, and there are radio and television stations in ethnic areas that broadcast news and entertainment programs in even more languages".

Azerbaijani nationalism has oscillated since the Islamic revolution and recently escalated into riots over the publication in May 2006 of a cartoon that many Azerbaijanis found offensive. The cartoon was drawn by Mana Neyestani, an ethnic Azerbaijani, who was fired along with his editor as a result of the controversy.

Another series of protests took place in November 2015, in the cities of Iranian Azerbaijan including Tabriz, Urmia, Ardabil and Zanjan, in response to an episode of a popular children's program called Fitileh which had depicted what was seen as a racist image of Azerbaijanis. Mohammad Sarafraz director-general of the IRIB and Davud Nemati-Anarki, the head of the public relations department, officially apologised for the "unintentional offense" caused by the program. Protests were also held in July 2016 in Tehran, Tabriz, Urmia, Maragheh, Zanjan, Ahar, Khoy, and Ardabil in response to "denigration of Azerbaijanis by the state media". Plastic bullets were shot at protesters and several people were arrested.

Despite sporadic problems, Azerbaijanis are an intrinsic community within Iran. Currently, the living conditions of Iranian Azerbaijanis closely resemble that of Persians:

Iranian Azerbaijanis are in high positions of authority with the Azerbaijanis Ayatollah Ali Khamenei currently sitting as the Supreme Leader. Azerbaijanis in Iran remain quite conservative in comparison to most Azerbaijanis in the Republic of Azerbaijan. Nonetheless, since the Republic of Azerbaijan's independence in 1991, there has been renewed interest and contact between Azerbaijanis on both sides of the border.
Andrew Burke writes:

According to Bulent Gokay:

Richard Thomas, Roger East, and Alan John Day state:

According to Michael P. Croissant:

While Iranian Azerbaijanis may seek greater linguistic rights, few of them display separatist tendencies. Extensive reporting by Afshin Molavi, an Iranian Azerbaijani scholar, in the three major Azerbaijani provinces of Iran, as well as among Iranian Azerbaijanis in Tehran, found that separatist sentiment was not widely held among Iranian Azerbaijanis. Few people framed their genuine political, social and economic frustration – feelings that are shared by the majority of Iranians – within an ethnic context.

According to another Iranian Azerbaijani scholar, Dr. Hassan Javadi – a Tabriz-born, Cambridge-educated scholar of Azerbaijani literature and professor of Persian, Azerbaijani and English literature at George Washington University – Iranian Azerbaijanis have more important matters on their mind than cultural rights. "Iran's Azerbaijani community, like the rest of the country, is engaged in the movement for reform and democracy," Javadi told the Central Asia Caucasus Institute crowd, adding that separatist groups represent "fringe thinking." He also told EurasiaNet: "I get no sense that these cultural issues outweigh national ones, nor do I have any sense that there is widespread talk of secession."

Culture
Iranian Azerbaijanis, a Turkic speaking people, are culturally a part of the Iranian peoples and have influenced Iranian culture. At the same time, they have influenced and been influenced by their non-Iranian neighbors, especially Caucasians and Russians. Azerbaijani music is distinct music that is tightly connected to the music of other Iranian peoples such as Persian music and Kurdish music, and also the music of the Caucasian peoples. Although the Azerbaijani language is not an official language of Iran it is widely used, mostly orally, among the Iranian Azerbaijanis.

Literature
Jahan Shah (r. 1438–67), the Qara Qoyunlu ("black sheep") ruler of Azerbaijan was a master poet. He compiled a diwan under the pen-name Haqiqi. Shah Isma'il (1487–1524), who used the pen-name Khata'i, was a prominent ruler-poet and has, apart from his diwan compiled a mathnawi called Deh-name, consisting of some eulogies of Ali, the fourth Caliph of early Islam. After the Safavid era, Azerbaijani could not sustain its early development. The main theme of the seventeenth and eighteenth centuries was the development of verse-folk stories, mainly intended for performance by Ashughs in weddings. The most famous among these literary works are Koroghlu, Ashiq Qərib, and Kərəm ilə Əsli.

Following the establishing of Qajar dynasty in Iran Azerbaijani literature flourished and reached its peak by the end of the nineteenth century. By then, journalism had been launched in Azerbaijani language and social activism had become the main theme of literary works. The most influential writers of this era are Fathali Akhondzadeh and Mojez Shabestari.

Pahlavi era was the darkest period for Azerbaijani literature. The education and publication in Azerbaijani language was banned and writers of Azerbaijan, such as Gholam-Hossein Saedi, Samad Behrangi and Reza Barahani, published their works in Farsi language. The only exception was Mohammad-Hossein Shahriar, who is famous for his verse book, Heydar Babaya Salam; simply he was too mighty to be censored. Shahriar's work was an innovative way of summarizing the Cultural identity in concise poetic form and was adapted by a generation of lesser-known poets, particularly from Qareh Dagh region, to record their oral traditions. One remarkable example is Abbas Eslami, known with his pen-name Barez, (1932–2011) who described the melancholic demise of his homeland in a book titled mourning Sabalan. Another example is Mohamad Golmohamadi's long poem, titled I am madly in love with Qareh Dagh (قاراداغ اؤلکه‌سینین گؤر نئجه دیوانه‌سی ام), is a concise description of the region's cultural landscape.

The long-lasting suppression finally led to a generation of revolutionary poets, composing verses by allegoric allusion to the imposing landscape of Azerbaijan:
Sahand, o mountain of pure snow,
Descended from Heaven with Zoroaster
Fire in your heart, snow on your shoulders,
with storm of centuries,
And white hair of history on your chest ...
Yadollah Maftun Amini (born in 1926)

After the Islamic revolution of 1979 the ban on Azerbaijani publications in Iran has eased. However, great literary works have not yet appeared and glory days of fifteenth century ruler-poets is not on the horizon. The contemporary literature is restricted to oral traditions, such as bayaties.

Music

Traditional Azerbaijani music can be classified into two categories: the music of "ashugh" and the "mugham". Mugham, despite its similarity to Persian classic music and utmost importance in Azerbaijan, has not been popular among Iranian Azerbaijanis. The ashugh music had survived in the mountainous region of Qaradağ and presently is identified as the representative of the cultural identity of Azerbaijanis. Recent innovative developments, aiming to enhance the urban-appealing aspects of this ashugh performances, has drastically enhanced the status of ashugh music. The opening of academic-style music classes in Tabriz by master ashughs, such as Ashig Imran Heidari and Ashig Changiz Mehdipour, has greatly contributed to the ongoing image building.

Art
Living in the crossroads of many civilizations, Azerbaijani artisans have developed a rich tradition of decorative arts including rugs, lace, printed textiles, jewelry, vessels made of copper, engraved metals, wooden articles, and ceramics. Among these, carpet weaving stands out as the acme of Azerbaijani art.

Carpet weaving
Tabriz is one of the main centers of carpet weaving in Iran. At present 40% of Iranian carpet exports are originated from Tabriz. These carpets are generally known as Tabriz rugs. Another carpet weaving center is Ardebil, which, despite being overshadowed by Tabriz in recent years, has produced the finest carpets in past. The two most famous Iranian rugs in the world had been woven in Ardebil in 1540. One is hung in the Victoria and Albert Museum in London, and the other is in the Los Angeles County Museum of Arts. These carpets have silk warps and contain over thirty million knots.

The acme of carpet weaving art is manifested in Verni, which was originated in Nagorno-Karabakh. Verni is a carpet-like kilim with a delicate and fine warp and woof, which is woven without a previous sketch, thanks to the creative talents of nomadic women and girls. Verni weavers employ the image of birds and animals (deer, rooster, cat, snake, birds, gazelle, sheep, camel, wolf and eagle) in simple geometrical shapes, imitating the earthenware patterns that were popular in prehistoric times. A key décor feature, which is intrinsic to many Vernis, is the S-element. Its shape varies, it may resemble both figure 5 and letter S. This element means "dragon" among the nomads. At present, Verni is woven by the girls of Arasbaran Tribes, often in the same room where the nomadic tribes reside, and is a significant income source for about 20,000 families in Qaradagh region. Verni weavers employ the image of birds and animals in simple geometrical shapes, imitating the earthenware patterns that were popular in prehistoric times.

Religion

The majority of Azerbaijanis are followers of Shia Islam. Azerbaijanis commemorate Shia holy days (ten first days of the holy month of Muharram) at least with the same intensity as other Iranians. In metropolitan cities with mixed ethnic composition, such as Tehran, Azerbaijanis are thought to be more intense in their expression of religious ritual than their Persian counterparts. However, Azerbaijanis are less inclined to Islamism. This is evident by the fact that just before the revolution Azerbaijanis followed either Mohammad Kazem Shariatmadari or Kho'i, both traditionalist jurists. In contrast, Persians followed more radical Ruhollah Khomeini.

There is also a small minority of Azerbaijanis who practice the Baháʼí Faith. Also in recent years, some Azerbaijanis in Iran have begun converting to Christianity, which is strictly prohibited and can result in imprisonment.

Followers of Yarisan religion (Goran in the Azerbaijani language) constitute a significant fraction of the population. In some regions Yarisan followers are sometimes known as Shamlus, a clear reference to the name of Shamlu tribe, which was one of the main constituents of Qizilbash confederation.

Notable people

See also
 Peoples of the Caucasus
 Peoples of the Caucasus in Iran

Notes

References

 
Azerbaijanis
Ethnic groups in the Middle East